David Hughes (born 1967 in Banagher, County Offaly) is an Irish former sportsperson. He played hurling with his local club St Rynagh's and was a member of the Offaly senior inter-county team from 1994 until 1997.

References

1967 births
Living people
St Rynagh's hurlers
Offaly inter-county hurlers
Hurling goalkeepers